The Annals of Rochester (Textus Roffensis) is a mediaeval manuscript that consists of two separate works written between 1122 and 1124.

Annals of Rochester may also refer to:
 The History of Rochester (also Historia Roffensis), a version of the 13th-century Flowers of History
 The Ecclesiastical History of the 14th-century monk Edmund of Hadenham